The Lotus Mark IX (1955) was an aluminium-bodied sports racing car manufactured by Lotus Engineering Ltd. About thirty of the Mark IX sports racing cars were made. It was closely related to the Lotus model Mark VIII (1954), of which only about seven cars were made. These cars were largely based on the innovative space frame of the Lotus Mark VI (1952).  The highly aerodynamic bodies were designed by Frank Costin and constructed by Williams & Pritchard Limited.

During this early era, of 1954–1955, Lotus Engineering was still a fledgling company, and cars were delivered in different states of completion on special orders.  Similar to the Mark VIII, the Mark IX was available in various configurations and different engines, including the 1500 cc MG, 1500 cc Connaught and 2-litre Bristol were fitted. However, the Mark IX designation is most often powered by the 1100 cc Coventry Climax engine. Apparently two models of Mark IX were offered – the "Club" and the "Le Mans", the latter of which had larger drum brakes fitted.

The chassis of the Mark IX was a new design, compared to that of the Mark VIII. Both were space frames of brazed steel tube. The new chassis was an advance over the Mark VIII in terms of the efficiency of its design and avoiding the VIII's need for diaphragm-stiffening panels. However, both chassis still used an oversized lower rail of  tube, a hang-over from the original design of the first Mark VI space frame.

A total of about thirty of the Mark IX sports racing cars were produced in various forms, and these were successfully raced in both Europe and the US. The first two examples of the Mark IX were apparently delivered to the US with the 1100 cc Coventry Climax engine to compete in the 1955 running of the 12 Hours of Sebring race and were beaten by a Porsche Spyder.  These cars were actually entered as Lotus Mark VIII models in the G class by Frank Miller of Larchmont, NY and by Bobby Burns and Norman J. Scott of Houston TX in, respectively, car numbers 78 and 79. The Lotus Works Team entered at least one Mark IX in the Le Mans 24 hour race in 1955, driven by Chapman, which may have been equipped with disc brakes. However, the car was disqualified apparently due to his reversing the car to re-enter the race track after going off course.

References 

Mark 09